Lüder is a municipality in the district of Uelzen, in Lower Saxony, Germany. 

Through the area flows a small river of the same name, with its source in the upland bog of the Völzberger Köpfchen and its mouth where it flows into the Fulda.

References

Municipalities in Lower Saxony
Uelzen (district)